Awashima may refer to:

13039 Awashima, main-belt asteroid
Awashimaura, Niigata, Japanese village
Awashima Island (disambiguation), several Japanese islands
Awashima Kaijō Ropeway, an aerial lift line in Numazu, Shizuoka, Japan

People with the surname
, Japanese actress
 

Japanese-language surnames